Cederquist is a surname. Notable people with the surname include:

John Cederquist (born 1946), American sculptor
Poul Cederquist (1916–1993), Danish hammer thrower

See also
Cederqvist